Renaudot is an impact crater in the Casius quadrangle on Mars at 42.4° N and 297.4° W and measures 64 kilometers in diameter. Its name was approved in 1973, and it was named after Gabrielle Renaudot Flammarion. Along its wall are evidence of old glaciers. The floor bears a field of dunes.

See also 
 Climate of Mars
 Fretted terrain
 Glaciers on Mars 
 Impact event
 List of craters on Mars
 Ore resources on Mars
 Planetary nomenclature
 Water on Mars

References 

Impact craters on Mars
Casius quadrangle